Kim Kardashian, Superstar (also known simply as Kim K Superstar) is a 2007 pornographic film featuring American television personality Kim Kardashian and singer-actor Ray J. It depicts the pair having sexual intercourse in October 2003 while on vacation in Cabo San Lucas, Mexico.

Background
The film features Kim Kardashian and Ray J in October 2003, in a luxury Esperanza resort in Cabo San Lucas, Mexico, for Kardashian's 23rd birthday. Ray J filmed much of the holiday with a handheld camcorder, capturing him and Kardashian "goofing around" and also having oral sex and sexual intercourse.

Kardashian was relatively unknown before the tape's release. She was known mainly as the daughter of Robert Kardashian, who was O. J. Simpson's defense attorney during Simpson's 1995 murder trial. She was also known as a friend and personal stylist for Paris Hilton after she appeared in three episodes of Hilton's show The Simple Life in 2006. She met Ray J in 2002 while working as a personal stylist to his sister, Brandy Norwood.

In December 2018, Kardashian claimed she had been on the drug ecstasy (MDMA) while the tape was recorded.

Release
The film was released on March 21, 2007, by Vivid Entertainment. According to a press release they issued, they purchased the tape from a "third party" for $1 million.

In February 2007, before its release, Kardashian sued Vivid Entertainment for invasion of privacy and for the profits from and ownership of the tape. She dropped the suit in late April 2007, settling with Vivid Entertainment for $5 million.

In April 2016, Ian Halperin alleged in his book Kardashian Dynasty that Kardashian and her mother, Kris Jenner, deliberately leaked the sex tape to Vivid Entertainment. According to Halperin, "A mutual friend of Kim and Paris Hilton had advised her that if she wanted to achieve fame, a sex tape would be the way to go ... Kim had discussed the idea of producing a tape with her family beforehand ... It was Kris who engineered the deal behind the scenes [with Vivid Entertainment] and was responsible for the tape seeing the light of day". On the release of Kardashian Dynasty, a representative for Kardashian and Jenner denied all of Halperin's assertions.

See also

 Celebrity sex tape
 Sex scandal

References

External links
 
 
 Kim Kardashian, Superstar on Vivid Entertainment

2007 films
2000s pornographic films
Sex scandals
Kim Kardashian
Films shot in Mexico
Films set in Mexico
Interracial pornographic films
2000s English-language films